The Sun International Ladies Challenge was a women's professional golf tournament held in Sun City, South Africa. It was an event on the Southern Africa-based Sunshine Ladies Tour between 2014 and 2017.

The tournament was held at the two courses within title sponsor Sun International's Sun City Resort, the Lost City Golf Course and Gary Player Country Club.

Winners

References

External links
Coverage on the Sunshine Tour's official site

Sunshine Ladies Tour events
Golf tournaments in South Africa